Proholoscotolemon is an extinct genus of armoured harvestmen in the family Cladonychiidae. There is one species in Proholoscotolemon, P. nemastomoides. It is known from specimens preserved in Baltic amber.

References

Harvestmen